Ka'Darius O'Keith Cannon (born November 5, 1995) is an American football wide receiver for the DC Defenders of the XFL. He played college football at Baylor. He has played for the Saskatchewan Roughriders of the Canadian Football League (CFL).

Early years
Cannon attended Mount Pleasant High School in Mount Pleasant, Texas. He had over 1,000 yards his final three seasons, including 1,252 as a senior with 80 receptions and 16 touchdowns. Cannon was ranked by Rivals.com as a four-star recruit and was ranked among the best wide receivers in his class. He committed to Baylor University to play college football.

College career
As a true freshman, Cannon played in all 13 games. He finished the season with Baylor freshman records 58 receptions for 1,030 yards and 8 touchdowns. As a Sophomore, Cannon played in all 13 games recording 50 receptions for 868 yards and 6 touchdowns. Following up a solid sophomore season with a great junior year, Cannon finished the year with 87 receptions for 1,215 yards and 13 receiving touchdowns. Cannon declared for the 2017 NFL Draft on December 28, 2016 after a huge performance in the Cactus Bowl in which he had 14 receptions for 226 yards and 2 touchdowns. After the season, Cannon announced that he decided he would  forgo his senior year and enter the 2017 NFL Draft.

College statistics

Professional career

San Francisco 49ers
After going undrafted in the 2017 NFL Draft, Cannon signed with the San Francisco 49ers as an undrafted free agent on April 29, 2017, but was waived by the 49ers on May 8, 2017, following their rookie mini-camp.

New York Jets
On May 9, 2017, Cannon was claimed off waivers by the New York Jets. He was waived on July 28, 2017.

Los Angeles Rams
On August 4, 2017, Cannon was signed by the Los Angeles Rams. He was waived on September 2, 2017.

Dallas Cowboys
On December 27, 2017, Cannon was signed to the Dallas Cowboys' practice squad. He signed a reserve/future contract with the Cowboys on January 1, 2018.

On September 1, 2018, Cannon was waived by the Cowboys.

Saskatchewan Roughriders
Cannon signed with the Saskatchewan Roughriders of the Canadian Football League (CFL) on October 7, 2018.

Cannon was moved to the Roughriders' practice roster on July 31, 2019, and was released on August 5, 2019.

Los Angeles Wildcats
In October 2019, Cannon was drafted by the Los Angeles Wildcats in the 2020 XFL Draft. He was waived during final roster cuts on January 21, 2020.

Seattle Dragons
Cannon signed with the XFL's Team 9 practice squad during the regular season. He was signed off of Team 9 by the Seattle Dragons on March 9, 2020. He had his contract terminated when the league suspended operations on April 10, 2020.

Vegas Knight Hawks
Cannon was signed by the Vegas Knight Hawks for the 2022 Indoor Football League season. He was released on November 2, 2022.

DC Defenders
Cannon was selected in the 3rd round of the 2023 XFL Skill Players Draft, by the DC Defenders.

References

External links
Baylor Bears bio

1995 births
Living people
American football wide receivers
People from Mount Pleasant, Texas
Baylor Bears football players
Sportspeople from Texas
Players of American football from Texas
San Francisco 49ers players
New York Jets players
Los Angeles Rams players
Dallas Cowboys players
Saskatchewan Roughriders players
Los Angeles Wildcats (XFL) players
Canadian football wide receivers
American players of Canadian football
Team 9 players
Seattle Dragons players
DC Defenders players